Vojko Lajovec (born March 18, 1962) is a former Yugoslav ice hockey player. He played for the Yugoslavia men's national ice hockey team at the 1984 Winter Olympics in Sarajevo.

References

1962 births
Living people
HDD Olimpija Ljubljana players
Ice hockey players at the 1984 Winter Olympics
Olympic ice hockey players of Yugoslavia
Slovenian ice hockey defencemen
Sportspeople from Ljubljana
Yugoslav ice hockey defencemen